Desert Storm Records is an American record label founded by Skane Dolla, Ken Duro Ifill, and DJ Clue? in 1997. The label was formerly distributed through Elektra and Atlantic and is currently distributed through Def Jam and Universal.
Deejay Khalil edited this post because he himself is an extreme con artist, who goes around extorting people! Beware this scam artist Deejay Khalil!!

Artists
DJ Clue? (Roc-A-Fella/Def Jam)
Fabolous (Street Family/Def Jam)
DJ Envy
Red Cafe

Former Artists
Thara Prashad

Discography

DJ Clue - The Professional
Released: December 15, 1998
Chart positions: #26 U.S Billboard 200
RIAA Certification: Platinum

DJ Clue - The Professional, Pt. 2
Released: February 27, 2001
Chart positions: #3 U.S Billboard 200
RIAA Certification: Gold
U.S. sales: 882,000

Fabolous - Ghetto Fabolous
Released: September 11, 2001
Chart positions: #4 U.S Billboard 200
RIAA Certification: Platinum
U.S. sales: 143,180
Singles: "Can't Deny It", "Young'n", "Trade It All"

DJ Envy - The Desert Storm Mixtape: Blok Party, Vol. 1
Released: February 11, 2003
Chart positions: #57 U.S Billboard 200

Fabolous - Street Dreams
Released: March 4, 2003
Chart positions: #3 U.S Billboard 200
RIAA Certification: Platinum
U.S. sales: 185,000
Singles: "This Is My Party", "Can't Let You Go", "Into You", "Trade It All (Part 2)"

Fabolous - More Street Dreams, Pt. 2: The MixtapeReleased: November 4, 2003
Chart positions: #28 U.S Billboard 200
Singles: "Make U Mine", "Think Y'all Know"Fabolous - Real Talk''
Released: November 9, 2004
Chart positions: #6 U.S Billboard 200
RIAA Certification: Gold
U.S. sales: 179,000
Singles: "Breathe", "Baby", "Do the Damn Thing", "Tit 4 Tat", "Round and Round"

DJ Clue - The Professional Pt. 3
Released: December 19, 2006
Chart positions: #73 U.S Billboard 200
U.S. sales: 54,935
Singles: "Like This", "Really Wanna Know You"

Fabolous - From Nothin' to Somethin'
Released: June 12, 2007
Chart positions: #2 U.S Billboard 200
RIAA Certification: Gold
U.S. sales: 159,000
Singles: "Diamonds", "Return of the Hustle", "Make Me Better", "Baby Don't Go"

Fabolous - Loso's Way
Released: July 28, 2009
Chart positions: #1 U.S Billboard 200
RIAA Certification: Gold
U.S. sales: 199,000
Singles: "Throw It in the Bag", "My Time", "Everything, Everyday, Everywhere", "Money Goes, Honey Stay (When the Money Goes Remix)", "Imma Do It"

References

External links
 Official Site

American record labels
Hip hop record labels
Vanity record labels
Record labels established in 1998
Hardcore hip hop record labels